Gulaki may refer to:
 Gulaki, Bushehr
 Gulaki, Semnan